Eusebonas (or Eusebonus) (fl. 5th century) was one of the founders of Bet-Coryph monastery in Byzantine Syria, together with Abibion. He received his instruction from Eusebius.

References
 Davies, Gordon J, Social Life of Early Christians, Lutterworth Press (1954)

5th-century deaths
Byzantine abbots
Byzantine saints
5th-century Christian saints
Year of birth unknown